On the Spot is an American weekly syndicated television series that debuted in September 2011. The series is produced and distributed by Bellum Entertainment Group.

Synopsis
On the Spot is a weekly syndicated trivia show that asks entertaining questions from different categories including untold history, globetrotting, origins, supernatural, in sickness and in health, myths, now and then, record setters, mad science and bad ideas. Example questions include:

Can a cow have an accent?

What came first, the color orange or the fruit?

As a kid, did Napoleon hate the French?

Was the name Google an accident?

Who got the world's longest standing ovation?

The show first aired nationally on September 18, 2011. The first 13 episodes were hosted by Eric Schwartz and included man-on-the-street segments where everyday people were asked the trivia questions (and many got the answers wrong), which led to each question being answered and explained. Later episodes had only unseen narrator Pete Sepenuk.

Episode Guide

Season 1
On The Spot premiered its first season in 2011 and aired across 90% of the United States.

Season Two 
The second season of On The Spot debuted September 16, 2012 and is currently airing across 91% of the United States.

References

External links
Official Website
Official Facebook
Official Twitter
Show profile at SNTA

2011 American television series debuts
2012 American television series endings
2010s American reality television series
First-run syndicated television programs in the United States
American hidden camera television series
Television series by 20th Century Fox Television
Television series by Tribune Entertainment